Four Dogs Playing Poker is a 2000 crime thriller directed by Paul Rachman starring Stacy Edwards, Balthazar Getty, Olivia Williams, Daniel London and Tim Curry.

Plot
A group of friends steal a valuable statuette for a ruthless art dealer. The amateur thieves botch the delivery of the statuette and the  art dealer demands that they pay him $1 million by the end of the week or face the consequences: certain death.

Desperate, the friends decide to take out a $1 million life insurance policy on one of themselves with the idea that if one of them is sacrificed, the others will collect on the policy and be able pay off the art dealer. What follows is a reckoning: The friends enter into a lethal lottery to choose who will be the victim and who will be the killer.

Cast

External links
 
 

2000 films
2000s crime drama films
2000 crime thriller films
2000s mystery films
American crime drama films
American mystery films
Films scored by Brian Tyler
2000 directorial debut films
2000 drama films
Warner Bros. direct-to-video films
2000s English-language films
2000s American films